Robert Godfrey was a Scottish footballer who played as a centre half in the Scottish League for Dumbarton, East Stirlingshire, Falkirk and Vale of Leven.

Personal life 
Godfrey served as a private in McCrae's Battalion of the Royal Scots during the First World War and was medically discharged due to hammer toe.

Honours 
Falkirk

 Stirlingshire Consolation Cup: 1912–13

Career statistics

References 

Scottish footballers
Scottish Football League players
British Army personnel of World War I
People from Larbert
Year of birth missing
Year of death missing
Place of death missing
1890s births
Association football wing halves
McCrae's Battalion
Royal Scots soldiers
Kirkintilloch Rob Roy F.C. players
Falkirk F.C. players
Stenhousemuir F.C. wartime guest players
Bathgate F.C. players
East Stirlingshire F.C. players
Ayr United F.C. players
Dumbarton F.C. players
St Bernard's F.C. players
Clackmannan F.C. players
Vale of Leven F.C. players